The Zeeman effect is the effect of splitting of a spectral line into several components in the presence of a static magnetic field. It is named after the Dutch physicist Pieter Zeeman, who discovered it in 1896 and received a Nobel prize for this discovery. It is analogous to the Stark effect, the splitting of a spectral line into several components in the presence of an electric field. Also similar to the Stark effect, transitions between different components have, in general, different intensities, with some being entirely forbidden (in the dipole approximation), as governed by the selection rules.

Since the distance between the Zeeman sub-levels is a function of magnetic field strength, this effect can be used to measure magnetic field strength, e.g. that of the Sun and other stars or in laboratory plasmas.
The Zeeman effect is very important in applications such as nuclear magnetic resonance spectroscopy, electron spin resonance spectroscopy, magnetic resonance imaging (MRI) and Mössbauer spectroscopy. It may also be utilized to improve accuracy in atomic absorption spectroscopy.
A theory about the magnetic sense of birds assumes that a protein in the retina is changed due to the Zeeman effect.

When the spectral lines are absorption lines, the effect is called inverse Zeeman effect.

Nomenclature

Historically, one distinguishes between the normal and an anomalous Zeeman effect (discovered by Thomas Preston in Dublin, Ireland). The anomalous effect appears on transitions where the net spin of the electrons is non-zero. It was called "anomalous" because the electron spin had not yet been discovered, and so there was no good explanation for it at the time that Zeeman observed the effect. Wolfgang Pauli recalls that when asked by a colleague why he looks unhappy he replied "How can one look happy when he is thinking about the anomalous Zeeman effect?".

At higher magnetic field strength the effect ceases to be linear. At even higher field strengths, comparable to the strength of the atom's internal field, the electron coupling is disturbed and the spectral lines rearrange. This is called the Paschen–Back effect.

In the modern scientific literature, these terms are rarely used, with a tendency to use just the "Zeeman effect".

Theoretical presentation
The total Hamiltonian of an atom in a magnetic field is

where  is the magnetic moment of the atom. The magnetic moment consists of the electronic and nuclear parts; however, the latter is many orders of magnitude smaller and will be neglected here. Therefore,

A more accurate approach is to take into account that the operator of the magnetic moment of an electron is a sum of the contributions of the orbital angular momentum  and the spin angular momentum , with each multiplied by the appropriate gyromagnetic ratio:

In the case of the LS coupling, one can sum over all electrons in the atom:

If the interaction term  is small (less than the fine structure), it can be treated as a perturbation; this is the Zeeman effect proper. In the Paschen–Back effect, described below,  exceeds the LS coupling significantly (but is still small compared to ). In ultra-strong magnetic fields, the magnetic-field interaction may exceed , in which case the atom can no longer exist in its normal meaning, and one talks about Landau levels instead. There are intermediate cases which are more complex than these limit cases.

Weak field (Zeeman effect)
The spin and orbital angular momentum vectors can be thought of as precessing about the (fixed) total angular momentum vector . The (time-)"averaged" spin vector is then the projection of the spin onto the direction of :

and for the (time-)"averaged" orbital vector:

Thus,

Using  and squaring both sides, we get

and:
using  and squaring both sides, we get

Combining everything and taking , we obtain the magnetic potential energy of the atom in the applied external magnetic field,

Taking  to be the perturbation, the Zeeman correction to the energy is

Example: Lyman-alpha transition in hydrogen
The Lyman-alpha transition in hydrogen in the presence of the spin–orbit interaction involves the transitions

 and 

In the presence of an external magnetic field, the weak-field Zeeman effect splits the 1S1/2 and 2P1/2 levels into 2 states each and the 2P3/2 level into 4 states.  The Landé g-factors for the three levels are:

Note in particular that the size of the energy splitting is different for the different orbitals, because the gJ values are different. On the left, fine structure splitting is depicted. This splitting occurs even in the absence of a magnetic field, as it is due to spin–orbit coupling. Depicted on the right is the additional Zeeman splitting, which occurs in the presence of magnetic fields.

Strong field (Paschen–Back effect)
The Paschen–Back effect is the splitting of atomic energy levels in the presence of a strong magnetic field. This occurs when an external magnetic field is sufficiently strong to disrupt the coupling between orbital and spin angular momenta. This effect is the strong-field limit of the Zeeman effect. When , the two effects are equivalent. The effect was named after the German physicists Friedrich Paschen and Ernst E. A. Back.

When the magnetic-field perturbation significantly exceeds the spin–orbit interaction, one can safely assume . The energies are simply

The above may be read as implying that the LS-coupling is completely broken by the external field. Together with the selection rules for an electric dipole transition, i.e.,  this allows to ignore the spin degree of freedom altogether. As a result, only three spectral lines will be visible, corresponding to the  selection rule. The splitting  is independent of the unperturbed energies and electronic configurations of the levels being considered. In general (if ), these three components are actually groups of several transitions each, due to the residual spin–orbit coupling.

In general, one must now add spin–orbit coupling and relativistic corrections (which are of the same order, known as 'fine structure') as a perturbation to these 'unperturbed' levels. First order perturbation theory with these fine-structure corrections yields the following formula for the hydrogen atom in the Paschen–Back limit:

Intermediate field for j = 1/2 
In the magnetic dipole approximation, the Hamiltonian which includes both the hyperfine and Zeeman interactions is 

In the case of weak magnetic fields, the Zeeman interaction can be treated as a perturbation to the  basis.
	
For , the Hamiltonian can be solved analytically, resulting in the Breit–Rabi formula.

We now utilize quantum mechanical ladder operators, which are defined for a general angular momentum operator  as

These ladder operators have the property

as long as  lies in the range  (otherwise, they return zero). Using ladder operators  and  
We can rewrite the Hamiltonian as

We can now see that at all times, the total angular momentum projection  will be conserved. This is because both  and  leave states with definite   and  unchanged, while  and  either increase  and decrease  or vice versa, so the sum is always unaffected. Therefore, for every value of  there are only two possible states, and we can define them as the basis:

This pair of states is a Two-level quantum mechanical system. Now we can determine the matrix elements of the Hamiltonian:

Solving for the eigenvalues of this matrix, (as can be done by hand - see Two-level quantum mechanical system, or more easily, with a computer algebra system) we arrive at the energy shifts:

where  is the splitting (in units of Hz) between two hyperfine sublevels in the absence of magnetic field ,
 is referred to as the 'field strength parameter' (Note: for  the expression under the square root is an exact square, and so the last term should be replaced by ). This equation is known as the Breit–Rabi formula and is useful for systems with one valence electron in an  level.

Note that index  in  should be considered not as total angular momentum of the atom but as asymptotic total angular momentum. It is equal to total angular momentum only if 
otherwise eigenvectors corresponding different eigenvalues of the Hamiltonian are the superpositions of states with different  but equal  (the only exceptions are ).

Applications

Astrophysics

George Ellery Hale was the first to notice the Zeeman effect in the solar spectra, indicating the existence of strong magnetic fields in sunspots. Such fields can be quite high, on the order of 0.1 tesla or higher.  Today, the Zeeman effect is used to produce magnetograms showing the variation of magnetic field on the Sun.

Laser cooling
The Zeeman effect is utilized in many laser cooling applications such as a magneto-optical trap and the Zeeman slower.

Zeeman-energy mediated coupling of spin and orbital motions

Spin–orbit interaction in crystals is usually attributed to coupling of Pauli matrices  to electron momentum  which exists even in the absence of magnetic field . However, under the conditions of the Zeeman effect, when , a similar interaction can be achieved by coupling  to the electron coordinate  through the spatially inhomogeneous Zeeman Hamiltonian

,

Such -dependent Zeeman Hamiltonian  couples electron spin  to the operator  representing electron's orbital motion. Inhomogeneous field  may be either a smooth field of external sources or fast-oscillating microscopic magnetic field in antiferromagnets. Spin–orbit coupling through macroscopically inhomogeneous field   of nanomagnets is used for electrical operation of electron spins in quantum dots through electric dipole spin resonance, and driving spins by electric field due to inhomogeneous  has been also demonstrated.

Other

Old high-precision frequency standards, i.e. hyperfine structure transition-based atomic clocks, may require periodic fine-tuning due to exposure to magnetic fields. This is carried out by measuring the Zeeman effect on specific hyperfine structure transition levels of the source element (cesium) and applying a uniformly precise, low-strenght magnetic field to said source, in a process known as degaussing.

See also

 Magneto-optic Kerr effect
 Voigt effect
 Faraday effect
 Cotton–Mouton effect
 Polarization spectroscopy
 Zeeman energy
 Stark effect
 Lamb shift

References

Historical
  (Chapter 16 provides a comprehensive treatment, as of 1935.)

Modern

 
 

Spectroscopy
Quantum magnetism
Foundational quantum physics
Articles containing video clips
Magneto-optic effects